Xylorycta luteotactella, commonly known as the macadamia twig girdler, is a moth of the family Xyloryctidae. It is found in Australia. The caterpillars cause economic damage to waratah and macadamia crops, the former by disfiguring the developing flowerheads.

References

Xylorycta
Moths described in 1864